Peter Serracino Inglott (26 April 1936 – 16 March 2012) was a Priest, Philosopher, Scholar and Rector of the University of Malta from 1987 to 1988, then consecutively from 1991 to 1996. He was awarded the title of Emeritus Professor of philosophy at the University of Malta. He was a key figure at reconstructing the Maltese education system and held academia to his personal life prominently. He was also politically affiliated with the country's Nationalist Party, serving as advisor to former Prime Minister of Malta, Eddie Fenech Adami.

Serracino Inglott was ordained in Milan by Cardinal Montini, later Pope Paul VI.

Life and career 
Born on 26 April 1936 to Oscar and Maria Calamatta, he was brought up during the post-war Maltese environment. Serracino-Inglott studied at the then Royal University of Malta (BA 1951–1955), Campion Hall, Oxford as a Rhodes Scholar (MA 1955–1958), the Institut Catholique de Paris (BD cum laude 1958–1960) and the Università Cattolica del Sacro Cuore (Ph.D. 1960–1963) with a thesis on Wittgenstein’s Tractatus Logico-Philosophicus. His start at the University of Malta was as a librarian in 1963 and just two years later he started teaching philosophy there. In 1971 he became an established professor at the University of Malta and served as chairperson of the University's chair of philosophy, a post he would retain for seven years until then Prime Minister of Malta, Dom Mintoff, suspended the chair. He would return as chairperson in 1987 when the post was resumed and would consecutively retain the post until 1996. Serracino Inglott was professor of aesthetics at the 'Instituto Internazionale di Arte e Liturgia' at Milan, visiting professor at Panthéon-Assas University (1989–1990), UNESCO Fellow at the Open University, UK (1978) and guest lecturer at the universities of Cincinnati, Milan (Cattolica), Venice (Ca Foscari), Palermo and the College of Europe at Bruges (1989, 1990).

During his advisory role within the Nationalist Party, his emphasis on welfare and charity was seen as strange within a fiscally conservative environment. He was often mistaken to be partisan, but had often expressed his sympathy with the Nationalist Party due to its positive relationship with the Catholic Church in Malta. With regards to the opposing Labour Party, Fr Peter had this to say of former Prime Minister Dom Mintoff: "The great pity is that I have always had a great deal of sympathy with Mintoff's ideas. It was his manner of implementing them that I always thought was wrong".

He was conferred honorary doctorates by Brunel University in the United Kingdom, Luther College, Iowa and the International Maritime Organization's International Maritime Law Institute. He was also honoured by the French, Italian, Portuguese and Maltese governments respectively with the Chevalier of the Légion d'honneur (1990), Cavaliere di Gran Croce of the Ordine al Merito (1995) and Companion of the Order of Merit (Malta) (1995).

He was one of three Maltese representatives at the Convention on the Future of Europe presided by Valéry Giscard d'Estaing, contributing to various aspects of the debate at the Convention ranging from proposed amendments to include a reference to Europe's Christian traditions to procedural proposals to streamline the EU's decision-making process.  He was one of the founder members of the Today Public Policy Institute.

The Priest was characterized as joyful, passionate about learning yet forgetful of everyday occurrences. His forgetfulness would sometimes result in comical situations which would cause confusion within his colleagues. Most notable was his office's order; described as messy and 'chaotic' yet somehow logical to and only to the Rector.

Fr. Peter Serracino Inglott was a lifelong friend with Maltese architect and designer Richard England. This friendship may have contributed to England's religiosity and emphasis on theurgy within his projects.

Philosophy
Language was at the centre of Serracino Inglott's philosophical work with Thomas Aquinas and Ludwig Wittgenstein as the two critical signposts on his conceptual terrain. He simultaneously sought to merge both rationalism and faith, and can be quoted saying: "The discovery of God is recognized within, especially within the Creation, and this is recognized from its study".

He had emphasized politics within his writings, placing man as 'central' to all political action. As advisor to the economically neo-liberal Nationalist Party, he sought to introduce some form of catholic economics within the party manifesto. Because of his care towards working class needs and leftist economics, he was often referred to as 'the red priest'.

Serracino Inglott published two principal philosophical texts (Beginning Philosophy 1987 and Peopled Silence 1995). Additionally, he wrote and expressed himself in the media on a variety of subjects (notably on biotechnology and human rights ) but the Mediterranean region stands out as a leitmotif in his thought and core interest. His study of language led to him writing 'The Creative Use of Noise''' with composer Charles Camilleri. Published posthumously in 2015, the book covers a structuralist interpretation of certain audible phenomena, the meaning of noise itself and the value of audible aesthetics.

Despite his social conservatism, Fr. Peter would still grant rationality great importance, even during situations which would grand controversy. In 2006 he infamously contradicted the Catholic Church's position on conception of human life as he argued that during the first fourteen days after fertilization, the entity present cannot be defined as a person.

A former student, Mario Vella, wrote a critical assessment of Serracino Inglott as philosopher, Reflections in a Canvas Bag: Beginning Philosophy Between Politics and History.

Fr. Peter is remembered for his contributions towards philosophy, mainly his hours of lectures and talks on language, culture and aesthetics.

Death
Fr. Peter Serracino Inglott died on 16 March 2012. He was diagnosed with Creutzfeldt–Jakob disease and was treated at Mater Dei Hospital. The funeral took place at the Church of Saint Paul, Valletta.

Selected bibliography

‘Secolarizzazione e linguaggio’, in Crisi dell’Occidente e Fondazione della Cultura (ed. N. Incardona), Palermo (1976);
‘Malta and the EEC: The Priority of Political Considerations’, in Azad Perspektiv, Malta, no. 8 (1979);Mediterranean Music, UNESCO (1988) with Charles Camilleri;
‘The Mediterranean Story-Telling Sailor: Odysseus and Sinbad’ in Atti della Terza Assemblea Plenaria della Communità delle Università Mediterranee (1989);
‘Responsabilità morali degli scienziati nei confronti delle generazioni future’ in Scienza ed Etica nella Centralità dell’ Uomo (ed. P. Cattorini), Milano (1990);Compostella, Malta (1993) Libretto of an Opera on the European significance of the pilgrimage in medieval and contemporary times;The Maltese Cross, Malta (1995) – A European Opera on the mystery of Schiller's Die Malteser;Pynchon, Wittgenstein and Malta (1995) with Petra Bianchi et al.;
The volume Interfaces, essays in honour of Peter Serracino-Inglott'' (1997) with contributions by:
Alain Blondy (Professor of History at the Sorbonne)
David E. Cooper (Professor of Philosophy at the University of Durham)
David Farley-Hills (Emeritus Professor at the University of Wales)
John Haldane (Professor of Philosophy and Head of the School of Philosophical and Anthropological Studies at the University of St. Andrews)
Peter Jones (Professor of Philosophy and Director of the Institute for Advanced Studies in the Humanities at the University of Edinburgh)
Elisabeth Mann Borgese (Professor of Politics at Dalhousie University)
Federico Mayor (Director General of UNESCO)
Paul Streeten (Professor of Economics and chairman of the editorial board of the bi-monthly journal World Development)
contains a brief biography of Peter Serracino Inglott by his successor in the chair of philosophy at the University of Malta Joe Friggieri and a very useful annotated bibliography.

See also
Philosophy in Malta

References

External links
Article from times of Malta.com
Department of Information, Malta
University of Malta
University of Malta, Faculty of Theology
Brunel University
European Convention, European Union
House of Representatives, Malta

1936 births
2012 deaths
Maltese Rhodes Scholars
Philosophy academics
Alumni of Campion Hall, Oxford
Academic staff of the University of Paris
Academic staff of the College of Europe
20th-century Maltese Roman Catholic priests
Catholic philosophers
20th-century Maltese philosophers
University of Malta alumni
Academic staff of the University of Malta